Epidauria transversariella is a species of snout moth in the genus Epidauria. It was described by Zeller in 1848. It is found in Croatia and Greece.

References

Moths described in 1848
Anerastiini
Moths of Europe
Moths of Asia